Several ships of the Royal Navy have borne the name, HMS Cyane.

  was an 18-gun sloop built in 1796 that the French captured in May 1805 and that the British recaptured in October, when she was renamed HMS Cerf; sold in 1809. She appeared in some records as Cayenne.
  was a  built in 1806 and captured in 1815; she served in the US Navy thereafter and was broken up in 1836.

Royal Navy ship names